Fusicladium pisicola is a species of fungal plant pathogen affecting pea plants.

References

External links 
 Index Fungorum
 USDA ARS Fungal Database

Fungal plant pathogens and diseases
Vegetable diseases
Venturiaceae